The Anglican Diocese of Athabasca is a diocese of the Ecclesiastical Province of Rupert's Land of the Anglican Church of Canada, in the northern half of the civil province of Alberta. It was created in 1874 by the division into four parts of the original Diocese of Rupert's Land. The Synod of the Diocese of Athabasca was organized in 1876. The diocese was then itself subdivided in 1892 to create the new dioceses of Selkirk (later renamed Yukon) and Mackenzie River and in 1933 to create the Diocese of The Arctic (which subsumed Mackenzie River).

The see city is Peace River. The diocese has had at least two other See Cities: Fort Simpson and Fort Vermilion. The bishop resided for a considerable period at Athabasca Landing, but it is not certain whether it was ever his "seat". Other cities in the diocese are Grande Prairie and Fort McMurray.

The diocesan bishop is David Greenwood, a priest in the diocese since 2015, who was elected 12th Bishop of Athabasca by the Diocesan Synod on 16 November 2019 in St James' Cathedral, Peace River.

Deans of Athabasca
The Dean of Athabasca is also Rector of St James Cathedral

1949–?: Roland Hill (1st Dean) 
: Edwin Thain
? –? Dean Roy Crisfield

? – ? Dean David Ellis
?–1979: James Hoskin 
1979–1987: Fabian Hugh  (afterwards Dean of Calgary, 1987) named Dean emeritus of Athabasca
1993–1998: Roland Wood (previously Bishop of Saskatoon, 1981–1993)
1998–2005: Michael Rolf
2006–2016: Iain Luke, later Principal of the College of Emmanuel and St. Chad, Saskatoon, SK. 
2017–present: Jason Haggstrom (previously [Dean of Caledonia] 2011–2017)

References

External links
 Diocese of Athabasca Official Site (Warning: website not current as of June 16, 2021).

Anglican bishops of Athabasca
Athabasca, Anglican Diocese of
Religious sees in Alberta
Anglican Province of Rupert's Land